Local elections were held in Taguig on May 10, 2010, within the Philippine general election. The voters will elect for the elective local posts in the city: the mayor, vice mayor, two District representatives, and councilors, eight in each of the city's two legislative districts.

Mayoral and vice mayoral election
Incumbents Sigfrido Tiñga and George Elias are now on their third term as mayor and second term as vice mayor, respectively. Ineligible for reelection, Tinga ran for Congressman at Taguig’s Second District instead.

Former Associate Justice Dante Tinga is running for Mayor as the nominee of both the Liberal Party and its Taguig affiliate, the local party Kilusang Diwa ng Taguig. Prior to the election, he was the Representative from Taguig-Pateros from 1987 to 1998 and Supreme Court Associate Justice. His running mate is incumbent Vice Mayor George Elias, who is currently in his second consecutive term.

Taguig–Pateros Congresswoman Lani Cayetano is on her first term as representative. Although eligible to run for a second term, she decided to run for mayor under Nacionalista Party instead.

Energy secretary Angelo Reyes reportedly backed out of race for Taguig Mayor to become a 1-UTAK party-list nominee.

Results
The candidates for mayor and vice mayor with the most votes wins the seat; they are voted separately, therefore, they may be of different parties when elected.

Mayoral election
Incumbent Taguig–Pateros representative Lani Cayetano defeated retired Associate Justice Dante Tinga. Justice Tinga later filed an election protest and accused Cayetano of massive vote-buying and pre-programmed CF cards altered results in Taguig.

Tinga's political party as stated on the ballot was Kilusang Diwa ng Taguig, a local affiliate of the Liberal Party.

Vice mayoral election

Dante Tinga and George Elias are also candidates of Kilusang Diwa ng Taguig

Congressional elections

1st District

Incumbent representative Lani Cayetano chose not to seek reelection to run for mayor of Taguig. Her party nominated her brother-in-law, former Muntinlupa councilor Rene Carl Cayetano. He and two other candidates, both independents, were defeated by former councilor Arnel Cerafica. Cerafica was also the nominee of the local party Kilusang Diwa ng Taguig.

Note: Result excludes Pateros; for the result including Pateros, see Philippine House of Representatives elections at Taguig-Pateros.

2nd District

Incumbent representative Henry Dueñas Jr. decided not to seek reelection to support outgoing mayor Sigfrido Tiñga, who was also nominated by the local party Kilusang Diwa ng Taguig.

On February 28, 2010, Angelito Reyes, son of Secretary of Energy Angelo Reyes, is declared the winner of the 2007 election by the House of Representatives Electoral Tribunal (HRET), with the HRET ruling that Reyes defeated Henry Dueñas Jr. by a margin of 57 votes; the Board of Canvassers originally declared Duenas the winner with 28,564 votes over Reyes' 27,107 for a margin of 1,457.

Tiñga defeated Reyes, councilor Arvin Ian Alit, and two independent candidates.

City Council elections
Each of Taguig's two legislative districts elects eight councilors to the City Council. The eight candidates with the most votes wins the seats per district.

1st  District
Incumbent Councilor Allan Paul Cruz and Delio Santos are in their third consecutive terms and is ineligible for reelection; Santos resigned as City Councilor and become Barangay Captain of Brgy.Bagumbayan.

Notes:
NPC's Ronnette Franco and Baltazar Mariategue are guest candidates of Kilusang Diwa ng Taguig
Kilusang Diwa ng Taguig is in coalition with Liberal Party, Nationalist People's Coalition and Lakas-Kampi CMD
TaPat Party of Ma.Laarni Cayetano is in coalition with Nacionalista Party

2nd District
Incumbent Councilors Marisse Balina-Eron and Arvin Ian Alit are in their third consecutive term and is ineligible for reelection; so Balina's Husband Jojo will run while Alit will run for Congressman. Incumbent councilor Rica Tinga  is eligible to run for a second term but she decided not to run in this election.

|-
|width=5px bgcolor=#f0e68c| ||width=200px| KDT (Liberal)
| Edwin "Jojo" Eron
| 39,159
|-
|width=5px bgcolor=#f0e68c| ||width=200px| KDT (Liberal)
| Milagros "Myla" Valencia
| 54,459
|-
|width=5px bgcolor=#f0e68c| ||width=200px| KDT (Liberal)
| Jeffrey "Jeff" Morales
| 46,139
|-
|width=5px bgcolor=#f0e68c| ||width=200px| KDT (Liberal)
| Ricardo "Ric" Jordan
| 52,041
|-
|bgcolor=#f0e68c| ||width=200px| KDT (Liberal)
| Aurelio Paulo "AP" Bartolome
| 57,552
|-
|bgcolor=#f0e68c| ||width=200px| KDT (Liberal)
| Michelle Ann "Cheche" Gonzales
| 50,816
|-
|bgcolor=#f0e68c| ||width=200px| KDT (Liberal)
| Estela "Tita Estel" Gasgonia 
| 52,989
|-
|bgcolor=#033F25| ||width=200px| KDT (NPC)
| Erwin "Win" Manalili
| 47,224
|-
|bgcolor=#98fb98| ||width=200px| TaPat (Nacionalista)
| Hareem "Harry" Pautin
| 23,919
|-
|bgcolor=#98fb98| ||width=200px| TaPat (Nacionalista)
| Wilfredo "Toto" Dubria
| 18,299
|-
|bgcolor=#98fb98| ||width=200px| TaPat (Nacionalista)
| Janine "Jaja" Bustos
| 26,928
|-
|bgcolor=#98fb98| ||width=200px| TaPat (Nacionalista)
| Queen Dolly Carreon
| 23,617
|-
|bgcolor=#98fb98| ||width=200px| TaPat (Nacionalista)
| Noel "DBoy" Dizon
| 27,691
|-
|bgcolor=#98fb98| ||width=200px| TaPat (Nacionalista)
| Guido Malco
| 13,468
|-
|bgcolor=#9ACD32| ||width=200px| TaPat (BP)
| Vilma "Ate Vi" Antigo
| 14,229
|-
|bgcolor=silver| ||width=200px| TaPat (Independent)
| Eugenio Sonny "Eugene" Calapit
| 13,765
|-
|bgcolor=#98fb98| ||width=200px| Nacionalista
| Ruth Fronda
|  5,544
|-
|bgcolor=#FF8C00| ||width=200px| Lingkod Taguig (PMP)
| Leo Aguilar
| 15,273
|-
|bgcolor=#F08080| ||width=200px| Lingkod Taguig (PRP)
| Margaret Jean "Margie" Defensor-Manalaysay
| 20,494
|-
|bgcolor=#0051B0| ||width=200px| Lingkod Taguig
| Marc Reyes
| 22,944
|-
|bgcolor=#0051B0| ||width=200px| Lingkod Taguig
| Lhorelyn "Lenlen" Fortuno
| 15,256
|-
|bgcolor=#0051B0| ||width=200px| Lingkod Taguig
| Maricar "Mara" Delfin-Villa
| 11,667
|-
|bgcolor=#0051B0| ||width=200px| Lingkod Taguig
| Celerino "Cely" Morada
|  5,882
|-
|bgcolor=#FF8C00| ||width=200px| Pwersa ng Masang Pilipino
| Ahiyal I. Sappayani
|  4,760
|-
|bgcolor=silver| ||width=200px| Independent
| Reynaldo Acas
|  3,409
|-
|bgcolor=silver| ||width=200px| Independent
| Hernando Mendoza
|  4,609
|-
|bgcolor=silver| ||width=200px| Independent
| Taharudin M. Mokalid
|  3,510
|-
|bgcolor=silver| ||width=200px| Independent
| Princess Jacel Ramos
| 10,146
|-
|bgcolor=silver| ||width=200px| Independent
| Eric Walter Salonga
| 14,787
|}

Leo Aguilar and Marge Defensor are candidates of Lingkod Taguig
Vilma Antigo and Eugene Calapit are candidate of TaPat Party
Erwin Manalili is a candidate of Kilusang Diwa ng Taguig
The results is Partial Unofficial Tally as of 2010-05-12 3:49 - 88.69% of ERs except for the 8 winning councilors.

References

External links
Official website of the Commission on Elections

2010 Philippine local elections
Elections in Taguig
2010 elections in Metro Manila